The Gerard Doustraat Synagogue is an Ashkenazi Orthodox synagogue located in Amsterdam's de Pijp neighborhood. The neo-Renaissance style building was designed by architect E.M. Rood and built in 1892.

The synagogue offers space for 250 men and 70 women. The building was completely renovated and refurbished in the 1990s. The synagogue hardly stands out from the residential buildings on the street, allowing services to continue until 1943, despite German occupation. The synagogue was the official residence of Chief Rabbi Justus Tal until his death in 1954.

References 

1892 establishments
Synagogues in the Netherlands